This is the discography of English musician John Miles (1949–2021). Over the years he released ten studio albums, two live albums, five compilation albums and eighteen singles.

Albums

Studio albums

Live albums

Compilation albums

Singles

References

External links

 Unofficial discography of John Miles
 

Rock music discographies
Discographies of British artists